Caloptilia cyanoxantha is a moth of the family Gracillariidae. It is known from Queensland.

References

cyanoxantha
Moths of Queensland
Moths described in 1920